Madison Phil Senini (born April 23, 1953, in Burley, Idaho), professionally known as M. Phil Senini, is an American actor, screenwriter and production associate.

Career
In 1977, Senini made his acting debut by playing the small role of a sharpshooter in the World War III threat film, Twilight's Last Gleaming. In 1979, Senini and Jerry-Mac Johnston co-wrote the lyrics to a song for the stage play, The Devil You Say, with music by Tom W. Cranson. There was a break in his Hollywood career until 1986, at which time he co-wrote the screenplay for the action movie, Getting Even, which starred Edward Albert. Again, there was a break in Senini's career until the early 1990s, when he was a production associate for the TV movies: A Mom for Christmas (1990) and Death Dreams (1991). Since May 2005, he has served as manager of sector communications for Northrop Grumman Integrated Systems.

Personal life
On April 13, 2007, Senini married Gina L. Piellusch. They divorced in 2013. The couple had one child together. Senini currently resides in McLean, Virginia.

Filmography

Film
Actor

Screenwriter

Television
Production associate

References

External links 
 

1953 births
American male film actors
American male screenwriters
Living people
People from Burley, Idaho
Male actors from Idaho
Screenwriters from Idaho